Kathleen Peterson is a painter and illustrator from the United States.

Career
Peterson studied art and dance at Brigham Young University (BYU). She works primarily in watercolor, pastel, pen and ink, batik, and oils. One reviewed explained, "There is much about sisterhood and motherhood in Peterson's oils; her warm palette narratives plead for peace, love and understanding."

Peterson's work has been included in numerous art exhibits including at the Central Utah Art Center. A series of 11 paintings of women from the scriptures were exhibited at the LDS Conference Center in Salt Lake City, Utah. She has been commissioned by Deseret Book Company for numerous book illustrations. Peterson is the illustrator for the Girls Who Choose God series of books.

Books 
Girls Who Choose God: Stories of Courageous Women from the Bible by McArthur Krishna and Bethany Brady Spalding. Illustrated by Kathleen Peterson. (Deseret Book Company, August 25, 2014)
Girls Who Choose God: Stories of Strong Women from the Book of Mormon by McArthur Krishna and Bethany Brady Spalding. Illustrated by Kathleen Peterson. (Deseret Book Company, October 12, 2015)
Pele and Poliahu by Malia Collins. Illustrated by Kathleen Peterson. (BeachHouse Publishing, September 10, 2018)
Girls Who Choose God: Stories of Extraordinary Women from Church History by McArthur Krishna and Bethany Brady Spalding. Illustrated by Kathleen Peterson. (Deseret Book Company, October 8, 2019)

Awards
Peterson was included in the 10th International Art Competition, Tell Me The Stories of Jesus, a juried exhibition at the Church History Museum in Salt Lake City, Utah.

Personal life
Peterson grew up in Provo, Utah and now lives in Spring City, Utah. She is a member of the Church of Jesus Christ of Latter-day Saints and is married and the mother of four children. She has been working to save two historic buildings in Utah's Sanpete Valley.

References

External links
 Kathleen Peterson Official website
 Girls Who Choose God Official website
 Kathleen Peterson I'm a Mormon, Country Girl, and Traveling Artist

Living people
21st-century American painters
21st-century American women artists
Painters from Utah
Latter Day Saints from Utah
Year of birth missing (living people)
Artists from Provo, Utah
Latter Day Saint artists
American Latter Day Saint artists
Brigham Young University alumni